Nishada is a genus of moths in the family Erebidae. They are found in India, Sri Lanka, Myanmar, Sumatra, and Borneo.

Description
Palpi short and porrect (extending forward) where the second joint is hairy. Antennae of male with cilia and bristles, the upper surface covered with rough scales. Forewing broad. The costa much arched and a large smooth patch on the inner area of underside for the articulation of the hindwing. Vein 5 absent. Veins 7 to 9 stalked. Vein 11 anastomosing (fusing) with vein 12. Hindwing of male with a costal fold from which large scales projects. Vein 4 absent. In female, vein 3,4 and 6,7 stalked. Vein 5 absent and vein 8 from middle of cell.

Species
Nishada aurantiaca Rothschild, 1913
Nishada aureocincta Debauche, 1938
Nishada benjaminea Roepke, 1946
Nishada brunneipennis Hampson, 1911
Nishada chilomorpha (Snellen, 1877)
Nishada flabrifera Moore, 1878
Nishada impervia Walker, 1864
Nishada marginalis (Felder, 1875)
Nishada melanistis Swinhoe, 1902
Nishada niveola Hampson, 1900
Nishada rotundipennis (Walker, 1862)
Nishada sambara (Moore, 1859)
Nishada schintlmeisteri Dubatolov & Bucsek, 2013
Nishada syntomioides (Walker, 1862)
Nishada tula Swinhoe, 1900
Nishada xantholoma (Snellen, 1879)

References

External links

Lithosiina
Moth genera